Margaret Nyairera Wambui (born 15 September 1995) is a Kenyan middle-distance runner specialising in the 800 metres.

In her first international competition, she won the gold at the 2014 World Junior Championships. She later competed at the 2015 World Championships without advancing from her heat. At the 2016 World Indoor Championships she won the bronze medal. That same year she competed at the 2016 Summer Olympics, setting a new personal best of 1:56.89 in the final, which also earned her a bronze.

In 2019, it was revealed that Wambui was born with the 46,XY karyotype and an intersex condition after her qualification for IAAF women's competition was affected by the association's new regulations for athletes with XY disorders of sex development, testosterone levels above 5 nmol/L, and androgen sensitivity.

Competition record

1Did not finish in the final

References

External links

Kenyan female middle-distance runners
Living people
People from Nyeri County
1995 births
World Athletics Championships athletes for Kenya
Athletes (track and field) at the 2016 Summer Olympics
Olympic athletes of Kenya
Olympic bronze medalists for Kenya
Olympic bronze medalists in athletics (track and field)
Medalists at the 2016 Summer Olympics
Commonwealth Games medallists in athletics
Commonwealth Games silver medallists for Kenya
Athletes (track and field) at the 2018 Commonwealth Games
Intersex women
Intersex sportspeople
Sex verification in sports
Medallists at the 2018 Commonwealth Games